Renée Eykens (born 8 June 1996) is a Belgian middle-distance runner. She competed in the 800 metres at the 2016 Summer Olympics reaching the semifinals. In addition, she is the 2015 European Junior gold medallist.

International competitions

Personal bests
Outdoor
800 metres – 2:00.00 (Rio de Janeiro 2016)
1000 metres – 2:47.79 (Brussels 2013)
1500 metres – 4:10.12 (Leuven 2016)
Indoor
800 metres – 2:02.15 (Birmingham 2019)

References

External links
 

1996 births
Living people
Belgian female middle-distance runners
People from Brasschaat
Athletes (track and field) at the 2016 Summer Olympics
Olympic athletes of Belgium
Belgian Athletics Championships winners
Competitors at the 2019 Summer Universiade
Sportspeople from Antwerp Province
21st-century Belgian women